Mount Laudon is a prominent mountain standing  north of Mount Crowell in the northwestern part of the Guettard Range, in southern Palmer Land, Antarctica. It was mapped by the United States Geological Survey from surveys and U.S. Navy air photos, 1961–67, and was named by the Advisory Committee on Antarctic Names for Thomas S. Laudon, a geologist at Byrd Station, summer season 1960–61, and a member of the University of Wisconsin geological party to the Eights Station area, summer 1965–66.

References

Mountains of Palmer Land